Col Costorphin (20 July 1958 – 4 September 1998) was an Australian cricketer. He played three first-class cricket matches for Victoria between 1977 and 1978.

See also
 List of Victoria first-class cricketers

References

External links
 

1958 births
1998 deaths
Australian cricketers
Victoria cricketers
Cricketers from Melbourne